Kamal Issah Sissoko (born 29 August 1992) is a Ghanaian professional footballer who last played as a midfielder for Swedish club Östersund.

Career
On 1 December 2014, it was announced that Issah had joined Norwegian Tippeligaen side Stabæk.

On 12 July 2017, he joined Grimsby Town on trial.

References

External links

Living people
1992 births
Footballers from Kumasi
Association football midfielders
Ghanaian footballers
FC Nordsjælland players
Stabæk Fotball players
Gençlerbirliği S.K. footballers
İstanbulspor footballers
Eskişehirspor footballers
Ankara Keçiörengücü S.K. footballers
Danish Superliga players
Eliteserien players
Süper Lig players
TFF First League players
Ghanaian expatriate footballers
Ghanaian expatriate sportspeople in France
Expatriate footballers in France
Ghanaian expatriate sportspeople in Norway
Expatriate footballers in Norway
Ghanaian expatriate sportspeople in Turkey
Expatriate footballers in Turkey